Camillo Gargano (30 January 1942 – 22 July 1999) was an Italian sailor. He won a bronze medal in the Star class at the 1968 Summer Olympics together with Franco Cavallo.

References

External links
 
 
  

1942 births
1999 deaths
Sportspeople from Ferrara
Italian male sailors (sport)
Sailors at the 1968 Summer Olympics – Star
Olympic sailors of Italy
Olympic bronze medalists for Italy
Medalists at the 1968 Summer Olympics
Olympic medalists in sailing
20th-century Italian people